The 2021 Southwestern Athletic Conference tournament was held at the Gulfport Sportsplex in Gulfport, Mississippi from May 11 through May 14, 2021. The tournament winner earned the SWAC's automatic bid to the 2021 NCAA Division I softball tournament

Tournament

Bracket

References

Tournament
Southwestern Athletic Conference softball tournament
Southwestern Athletic Conference softball tournament